Ko Sung-kuk (born 1955 ~ ) is a South Korean political scientist.

During his career as an instructor for the Political Science Department at Korea University, the authorities sentenced Ko Sung-kuk to 3 years of imprisonment, and to a 3-year suspension of teaching license under the National Security Act on November 27, 1986.

Works
Ko, Sung-kuk, 고성국의 정치IN, 미지애드컴 (June 11, 2011), 
Ko, Sung-kuk, 10대와 만나는 정치와 민주주의, 철수와영희 (May 5, 2011), 
Ko, Sung-kuk, Chang, Ha-Joon, et al., 불량사회와 그 적들, 기파랑 (April 25, 2011), 
Ko, Sung-kuk, 10대와 통하는 정치학, 철수와영희 (December 19, 2007),

References

External links
  Naver People

1958 births
People from Daegu
South Korean political scientists
Living people